Cereus spegazzinii is a species of cactus found in Argentina, Bolivia, Brasil and Paraguay.

Description

Cereus spegazzinii is a cactus that grows and branches abundantly. It is erect, sloping or almost creeping, with many cylindrical stems, of blue-green color often of glossy marble color. They grow up to 2 m in length and have a diameter of up to 6.5 cm. It has three to five ribs with very wide areoles. The first with two to three spines, and later with six blackish spines, and up to 1.5 cm in length. The flowers are white are 10 to 13 cm long and have a diameter of 7 to 9 cm. The fruits are pink ellipsoids.

References

External links
 
 

spegazzinii